House of Travel is the largest privately owned travel company in New Zealand and the third largest travel organisation in the Asia Pacific region.

The House of Travel Group employs close to 2,000 staff operating in a number of different brands and businesses, including:

 75 House of Travel retail travel stores throughout New Zealand 
 Orbit World Travel, a specialist business travel service in both New Zealand and Australia 
 HOT Events, a conference and incentive management company in New Zealand and Australia. 
 Mix and Match, the online branch of House of Travel in New Zealand 
 TravelManagers Australia 
 HOOT Holidays Australia

House of Travel was the official agent for travel from New Zealand for the 2014 Commonwealth Games,  2016 Olympic Games in Rio de Janeiro and is the official travel partner of Netball New Zealand and the Silver Ferns.

History
Founded by Chris Paulsen, who remains the Executive Chairman of House of Travel today, the first House of Travel store was established in Timaru in 1987. Each store is run on a joint ownership model – half-owned by a local owner operator, and half-owned by House of Travel Holdings. Local store owners use their regional knowledge and entrepreneurial skill and are supported by House of Travel Holdings (based in Auckland and Christchurch) in areas such as IT, product, marketing and HR.

By 1990, House of Travel had opened 20 stores across the North and South Islands. In 1998, there were 50 House of Travel stores in New Zealand. In 2001, House of Travel identified the growing market segment of corporate travel, resulting in a number of existing locations being rebranded as Orbit Travel to focus almost exclusively on business travel. Orbit is now the largest corporate travel company in New Zealand.

House of Travel launched the first online booking solution in New Zealand in 2004, offering full flight aggregation. House of Travel Online was branded mixandmatch in 2009 and is now the largest online travel agency for flight bookings in New Zealand. 
Today there are more than 75 House of Travel stores across New Zealand, from Kerikeri in the north to Invercargill in the South.

Awards
2006: New Zealand Entrepreneur of the Year, Ernst & Young Awards – Chris Paulsen, Chairman and Founder of House of Travel

2007: Prime Minister's Social Hero Award – for work with Hospice New Zealand

2012, 2013, 2014, 2015, 2016, 2017, 2018, 2019: Randstad Top 20 Most Attractive Employers

2013: Chairman's Circle Honour from the US Travel Association – House of Travel.

2013: Australian Federation of Travel Agents (AFTA) Award for Best Travel Agency Retail, Multi Location.

2013: Australian Federation of Travel Agents (AFTA) Award for Best Travel Agency Corporate, Multi Location.

Travel Agents’ Association of NZ (TAANZ) Award for Best Travel Agency Brand: 2013, 2014, 2015, 2016, 2017.

2016: New Zealander of the Year Local Hero Award, for support of Hospice Chris Paulsen.

2017: Reader's Digest Quality Service Award.

2018: Travel Agents’ Association of New Zealand (TAANZ) National Travel Industry Lifetime Achievement Award, Chris Paulsen.

References

External links
 Official website

Travel agencies
Travel and holiday companies of New Zealand
Transport companies established in 1987
Travel and holiday companies of Australia
Companies based in Auckland
New Zealand companies established in 1987